Siro kamiakensis is a species of mite harvestman in the family Sironidae. It is found in North America.

References

Further reading

 

Harvestmen
Articles created by Qbugbot
Animals described in 1943